Peng Jiamu (born 19 May 1925, disappeared 17 June 1980) was a Chinese biochemist and explorer.

Biography
Peng was born in Guangzhou, Guangdong province in 1935. He received a biology degree from Central University of China (now Nanjing University), graduating in 1947 and subsequently joined Shanghai Institute of Biochemistry, where he studied and worked under Cao Tianqin. He joined several scientific expeditions to Xinjiang organized by the Chinese Academy of Sciences (CAS), starting in 1956. On the expeditions he catalogued species of flora and fauna and measured potassium accumulation in the Lop Nor desert.

Disappearance
Peng led a 1980 expedition to the Lop Nur desert where he disappeared on June 17, leaving a note saying he had gone out to find water.

A large scale hunt for him was unsuccessful and widely covered by Chinese media. A TV documentary series named Searching for Peng Jiamu covered the events up to and after his disappearance. On six occasions between 2005 and 2007, human remains were discovered that could have been his, but could not be proven as such.

See also
 List of people who disappeared

References

1925 births
1980 deaths
1980s missing person cases
Biologists from Guangdong
Chemists from Guangdong
Chinese biochemists
Chinese explorers
Missing person cases in China
Nanjing University alumni
People from Panyu District